Marjan Dikaučič is a Slovenian politician. From 15 June 2021 to 1 June 2022 he served as minister of justice in the cabinet of Prime Minister Janez Janša.

References 

Living people
Year of birth missing (living people)
Place of birth missing (living people)
21st-century Slovenian politicians
Justice ministers of Slovenia